Alphonse Matejka (9 January 1902 in St. Gallen, Switzerland - 27 October 1999 in La Chaux-de-Fonds, Switzerland) was a famous Occidentalist of Czech origin.

Biography 
The Matejkas were originally from Wischkovitz (Bohemia). His father arrived in Switzerland before 1900, maybe due to the lack of job opportunities in the Czech Republic. He was granted Swiss citizenship in 1915. His son Alphonse was born in St. Gallen the 9 January 1902. He spent his last years as a student in the mercantile section of the cantonal school where he founded a student union under the name of Industria Sangallensis.

Due to his linguistic ability, he managed to get a job at Reichenbach & Co. That company would later transfer him to its subsidiary in Paris. There, he met his wife, Jeanne Bellanger. The couple got married in 1928.

In the 30s he moved to Zurich and then to Amsterdam in 1936, coming back to Switzerland to finally settle down in La Chaux-de-Fonds. He got a job at the watchmaking industry.

Linguistic endeavours 
Alphonse Matejka was able to speak several Romance and Germanic languages. He also spoke Russian, being able to write for a Russian journal and even translate to that language for the Russian Academy of Sciences.

He got engaged in the Ido movement. However, he started supporting Occidental in 1937.

In 1942 he published the first edition of the textbook OCCIDENTAL die internationale Welthilfssprache. It was followed in 1945 by Wörterbuch Occidental-Deutsch e Deutsch-Occidental. This book was based upong the works of Joseph Gär and Ric Berger. After the language name was changed to Interlingue, he wrote and updated the book Interlingue die natürliche Welthilfssprache, für Millionen geschaffen, von Millionen verstanden. Vollständiger Lehrgang in 20 Lektionen.

He was also Cosmoglotta's main editor for several years.

References 

Interlingue
Linguists from Switzerland
20th-century linguists
1902 births
1999 deaths
Interlingue speakers